The Newark Co-Pilots were a minor league baseball team based in Newark, New York that played in the New York–Penn League from 1968 to 1979. They were affiliated with the Seattle Pilots from 1968 to 1969 and with the Milwaukee Brewers from 1970 to 1978. They were independent in 1979. Their home ballpark was Colburn Park.

Notable alumni

Hall of Fame alumni

 Robin Yount (1973) Inducted, 1999

Notable alumni

 Kevin Bass (1977) MLB All-Star

 Bill Castro (1971)

 Frank DiPino (1977)

 George Frazier (1976) 

 Jim Gantner (1974) MLB All-Star

 Moose Haas (1974)

 Doug Jones (1978) 5 x MLB All-Star

 Tom Kelly (1968) 1991 AL Manager of the Year; Manager: 2 x World Series Champion Minnesota Twins (1987, 1991)

 Dave LaPoint (1977) 

 Sixto Lezcano (1971)

 Charlie Moore (1971)

 Lary Sorensen (1976) MLB All-Star

 Earl Torgeson (1969)

Year-by-year record

References

Baseball teams established in 1968
Baseball teams disestablished in 1979
Defunct baseball teams in New York (state)
Defunct New York–Penn League teams
Milwaukee Brewers minor league affiliates
Seattle Pilots minor league affiliates
1968 establishments in New York (state)
1979 disestablishments in New York (state)